The Egmont by-election of 1912 was a by-election held during the 18th New Zealand Parliament in the electorate of . The seat became vacant due to the resignation of Thomas Mackenzie after the fall of his government. The by-election was held on 17 September and was won by Charles Wilkinson.

Results
The following table gives the election results:

References

Egmont 1912
1912 elections in New Zealand
Politics of Taranaki